The World Amazigh Congress (CMA) (in Tamazight ⴰⴳⵔⴰⵡ ⴰⵎⴰⴹⵍⴰⵏ ⴰⵎⴰⵣⵉⵖ; Romanized: Agraw Amaḍlan Amaziɣ) is an international non-governmental organization made up of Amazigh sociocultural and development associations from both North Africa and the diaspora to have a coordination and representation structure.

It was founded at the first-ever congress held between 1-3 of September in 1995 in Saint-Rome-de-Dolan, France which brought together over a hundred delegates and representatives from Amazigh tribes and associations, from countries all over North Africa, Europe, and America. The organization is based in Paris and is independent of any states and political parties.

The World Amazigh Congress has been described as the "United Nations of the Amazigh people" due to its inclusivity, representation of all tribes from all over North Africa, gender equality, and transparency.

In October 2011, Fathi Ben Khalifa was elected president of the Congress, replacing Belkacem Lounes and in July 2015, Kamira Nait Sid was elected as a new president of the Congress.

References

External links
Official homepage

Cultural promotion organizations
Berberism